Sheartail can refer to:

 hummingbirds in 2 genera, Calothorax and Doricha
 The Peruvian Sheartail

Animal common name disambiguation pages